Lex non scripta is a Latin expression that means "'law not written'" or "'unwritten law'".  It is a term that embraces all the laws which do not come under the definition of written law or "lex scripta" and it is composed, principally, of the law of nature, the law of nations, the common law, and customs.

See also
 List of Latin phrases
 Unspoken rule

Latin legal terminology